The Juniper Island Light on Juniper Island in Vermont is the oldest light station on Lake Champlain and the oldest surviving cast iron lighthouse in the United States.

History
A light station was established on the island in 1826, displacing a private beacon consisting of a lantern on a post. The tower constructed was of brick, 30 feet tall, and lit with the lamp and reflector system typical of the period. The light was intended to indicate to ships the proximity of Burlington's harbor. This tower was reported to be in disrepair by 1838.

This tower was constructed of four rings of cast iron, attached to a brick keeper's house through a passageway. This tower originally retained the old light's beacon, but was upgraded with a fourth-order Fresnel lens in 1853. Early in the next century, the island was used as a storage depot for fuel, buoys, and other items.

The light was deactivated in 1954 in favor of a steel tower placed closer to the water, and the island as a whole was sold at auction to state senator Fred Fayette. Unfortunately the keeper's house was severely damaged by fire in 1962, though the tower and a separate shed for a fog bell were undamaged. Fayette's family inherited the property, and in 2001 they reconstructed the house using bricks from the remains of its predecessor. Two years later a new, taller tower replaced that of 1954. The family plans to restore the old tower, but it is unlikely to be relit (as has been done with other lights on the lake) since trees on the island obscure it from the water.

References

Further reading

 

Lighthouses completed in 1826
Lighthouses completed in 1846
Lighthouses in Vermont
Transportation buildings and structures in Chittenden County, Vermont
1826 establishments in Vermont